Eupholus schoenherrii is a species of beetle belonging to the  family Curculionidae. Eupholus petitii is sometimes included here as a subspecies.

Description
The basic colour of this species is quite variable. Usually it is metallic blue-green, with some transversal black bands along the elytra. The legs are bright blue. The blue-green colour derives from very small scales. The top of rostrum and the end of the antennae are black.

Distribution
This species can be found in New Guinea

Etymology
The species name honours the Swedish entomologist Carl Johan Schönherr.

References 

 Universal Biological Indexer
 Eupholus shoenherri

Entiminae
Insects of Papua New Guinea
Insects of Western New Guinea
Taxa named by Félix Édouard Guérin-Méneville
Beetles described in 1838